Ricardo Baliardo (7 August 1921 – 5 November 2014), better known as Manitas de Plata, was a flamenco guitarist of Spanish Gitano descent born in southern France.  Despite achieving worldwide fame, he was criticized for not following certain rhythmic rules (compás) that are traditional in flamenco.

Life and career
Baliardo was born in a gypsy caravan in Sète, southern France. He became famous by playing each year at the Saintes-Maries-de-la-Mer gypsy pilgrimage in the Camargue, where is he was recorded live by Deben Bhattacharya.

Manitas de Plata ("Little Hands of Silver" in Spanish) only agreed to play in public ten years after the death of Django Reinhardt.. One of his recordings earned him a letter from Jean Cocteau acclaiming him as a creator.

Upon hearing him play at Arles in 1964, Pablo Picasso is said to have exclaimed "that man is of greater worth than I am!" and proceeded to draw on the guitar.

De Plata attained fame in the United States only after a photography exhibition in New York, organized by his friend Lucien Clergue. He had recorded his first official album in the chapel of Arles in France, in 1963, for the Phillips label. It was later re-released, in 1967, by the Connoisseur Society label and sold through the Book of the Month Club. This was a popular LP that brought him to the attention of an American audience. An American manager obtained a booking for him to play a concert in Carnegie Hall in New York on November 24, 1965.

He toured the world from 1967, and recorded discs. He played with the dancer Nina Corti. In 1968 he played at the Royal Variety Performance in London.
He toured Australia in September 1972 supported by Los Baliardos (Hippolyte Baliardo, Manero Baliardo, José Reyes, Ricardo Bissaro). His Sevillana was included in Scorsese's After Hours (1985) soundtrack.

De Plata was the uncle of Jacques, Maurice, and Tonino Baliardo and cousin to Paul, François (Canut), Patchaï, Nicolas and André Reyes (the sons of his cousin, flamenco artist José Reyes (1928-1979), all members of the Catalan Rumba band Gipsy Kings. Australian multi-instrumentalist Chris Freeman, his student in 1971, acknowledged de Plata's influence and teachings.

De Plata died in a retirement home in Montpellier on 6 November 2014. The cause of death was not disclosed; it was reported that he had been in poor health since a severe heart attack in April 2013.

Many members of his own family were also well known flamenco musicians, including his younger brother Hippolyte Baliardo (1928-2009), and his eldest son Manero Baliardo (1940-2012). Another son, Bambo Baliardo, is still an active musician and performer as of 2015.

Selected albums
Juerga! (1963, Philips, 844 535 PY)
Flamenco Guitar (1965)
Flamenco Guitar
Manitas de Plata - The world's greatest living flamenco artist (1966, Phillips, BL 7787)
Manitas et les siens (1967, Columbia Records, FL 363)
Flamenco Magic (1967, Columbia Records, CS 9558)
Flamenco!! (L'Espagne De Manitas) (1968, CBS, 63449)
The Art of the Guitar (1968, Everest Records, SDBR 3201)
La guitare d'or de Manitas (1970, Columbia Records, S 63915)
Et Ses Guitares Gitanes (1972, CBS, S65020)
Excitement of Manitas De Plata (1973, RCA Camden, CDS 1139)
Hommages (1973, Embassy Records, S EMB 31003)
Soleil des Saintes-Maries (1978)Feria Gitane (1994)Olé (1969)Manitas de Plata at Carnegie Hall (1995)Flaming Flamenco (1997)Manitas de Plata (1998)Camargue de Manitas (1999)Guitare D'Or Manitas de Plata (1999)Flores de mi corazon (1999, Troubadour Records)Guitarra Flamenco (2001)Manitas de Plata y los Plateros (2004)

See alsoGitanos'', Romani people in Spain
Los Niños de Sara

References

External links

Profile, Foroflamenco.com; accessed 6 November 2014

1921 births
2014 deaths
People from Sète
French Romani people
Flamenco guitarists
French guitarists
French male guitarists
Romani guitarists
Columbia Records artists
Philips Records artists
20th-century French musicians
20th-century guitarists
20th-century French male musicians